Hemisphaeranthos is an extinct genus of sea cucumbers. The following species are recognised in the genus Hemisphaeranthos:
 †Hemisphaeranthos costifera Terquem & Berthelin, 1875 
 †Hemisphaeranthos elegans (Schlumberger, 1888) 
 †Hemisphaeranthos frankei (Müller, 1912) 
 †Hemisphaeranthos simplex A.H. Müller, 1964

References

 Thuy B, Gale AS, Kroh A, Kucera M, Numberger-Thuy LD, Reich M, et al. (2012) Ancient Origin of the Modern Deep-Sea Fauna. PLoS ONE 7(10): e46913. doi:10.1371/journal.pone.0046913

Holothuroidea genera